The western dwarf gecko (Lygodactylus guibei) is a small species of gecko, a lizard in the family Gekkonidae. The species is  endemic to Madagascar.

Etymology
The specific name, guibei, is in honor of French herpetologist Jean Marius René Guibé.

Habitat

Reproduction
L. guibei is oviparous.

References

Further reading
Glaw F, Vences M (1994). A Fieldguide to the Amphibians and Reptiles of Madagascar, Second Edition. Cologne, Germany: Vences & Glaw Verlag / Serpents Tale. 480 pp. .
Pasteur G (1965). "Notes préliminaires sur les lygodactyles (gekkonidés). IV. Diagnoses de quelques formes africaines et malgaches ". Bulletin du Muséum d'Histoire Naturelle, Paris 36: 311–314. (Lygodactylus guibei, new species). (in French).
Rösler H (2000). "Kommentierte Liste der rezent, subrezent und fossil bekannten Geckotaxa (Reptilia: Gekkonomorpha)". Gekkota 2: 28–153. (Lygodactylus guibei, p. 93). (in German).

Lygodactylus
Reptiles described in 1965
Reptiles of Madagascar
Endemic fauna of Madagascar